Eunice Elizabeth Sargaison (17 March 1928 – 8 June 2018), known professionally as Eunice Gayson, was an English actress best known for playing Sylvia Trench, James Bond's love interest in the first two Bond films (Dr. No and From Russia with Love) and is thus considered to have been the first "Bond girl". Appearing in this capacity in two movies, she was unique in this regard until Lea Seydoux (as Madeleine Swann).

Early life
Gayson and her twin sister Patricia were born in 1928 in Croydon to John and Maria Sargaison (née Gammon). Her father was a civil servant. The family lived in Streatham, London and moved to Purley, Surrey and later Glasgow, before settling in Edinburgh. There she attended the Edinburgh Academy and studied operatic singing.

Career

Gayson played a major role in the Hammer horror film The Revenge of Frankenstein and appeared on television in series such as The Saint (which starred a future James Bond, Roger Moore) and The Avengers. She played the Baroness Elsa Schraeder in the 1962 London stage production of The Sound of Music, during which time she also filmed scenes for the first two Bond films, Dr. No (1962) and From Russia with Love (1963). She remained a regular in London theatre, appearing in, among other productions, the comedy The Grass Is Greener (1971). In the early 1990s, Gayson appeared in Stephen Sondheim's Into the Woods in the role of the grandmother.

Bond films
In the first two James Bond films, Dr. No and From Russia with Love, Gayson played James Bond's love interest in London, Sylvia Trench. In early scenes, Bond attempts to set up a liaison with her but gets called away on a mission before anything serious can develop. This was intended to be a running motif in multiple films, but the character was dropped after the second film. The character is responsible for Bond's iconic introductory catchphrase, "Bond, James Bond"; when Trench introduces herself to Bond as "Trench, Sylvia Trench" during a game of chemin de fer in Dr. No, Bond replies in kind, mimicking Trench's own cadence, after she inquires of him "Mister?" 

Gayson had initially been cast in Dr. No as Miss Moneypenny, M's secretary, while the actress who played Moneypenny, Lois Maxwell, had been cast as Sylvia Trench. However, Maxwell found the Trench character too immodest, and their roles were switched. 
Gayson is therefore considered the first "Bond girl."

Personal life
Gayson married the writer Leigh Vance in 1953, a marriage that was featured on the American daytime television series Bride and Groom. They divorced in 1959, and in 1968 she married the film and stage actor Brian Jackson. She and Jackson had a daughter before divorcing after ten years of marriage. Their daughter Kate would later appear in the casino scene in the 1995 Bond film GoldenEye. Gayson died on 8 June 2018, aged 90.

Filmography

References

External links

Eunice Gayson at the British Film Institute

1928 births
2018 deaths
English film actresses
Actresses from London
20th-century English actresses
People from Streatham
People from Purley, London
Actresses from Glasgow
Actresses from Edinburgh